The Philippine Basketball Association (PBA) Philippine Cup is a tournament that does not allow teams to hire foreign players or imports. Before 2004–05 season, the tournament was then known as the PBA All-Filipino Cup. It is considered the most prestigious of the three conferences in a PBA season. The San Miguel Beermen are the conference's current defending champions.

Since the 2006–07 season, the Jun Bernardino Trophy were awarded to the champions. The trophy is worth PHP 500,000 and is made up of 24-karat gold plate, which the champions can keep for a year. After that, they will receive a smaller replica of the trophy. If a team wins three consecutive tournaments, the franchise gets to keep the trophy and not the replica. The trophy is named after former PBA commissioner Jun Bernardino.

In the history of the league, the TNT Tropang Texters (2010–11 to 2012–13) and the San Miguel Beermen (2014–15 to 2018–19) have won the All-Filipino Conference at least three consecutive times. By achieving this distinction, TNT and San Miguel were able to have permanent possession of the Bernardino Trophy. TNT keeps the 2006 version while San Miguel keeps the 2013 version.

The 1975 and 1976 editions of the tournament were reclassified as an import-laden conference since the league gave the lower-ranking teams the option of hiring imports to bolster their respective lineups. The first tournament that prohibited teams from hiring foreign players or imports was held in 1977.

The 1981 and 1982 seasons did not have an All-Filipino Conference.

List of All-Filipino/Philippine Cup champions

Per season

* Two all-Filipino conferences were held on 1984.

Per franchise

* Defunct franchise.
**The 1975 and 1976 editions of the tournament are not considered All-Filipino Conferences since the league gave the lower-ranking teams the option of hiring imports to bolster their respective lineups.

Individual awards

Best Player of the Conference

References

 
Philippine Cup
Recurring sporting events established in 1975